The Imperial Russian narrow railway track gauge was , the current track gauge is predominantly . In Soviet Russia, narrow-gauge railways were mostly common in forestry and peat industries in low inhabited places. Usually they have one main line and number of temporary branches. There was commonly a passenger service to villages and towns for workers. 

As of the mid 2010s, a number of industrial railways survive in places with bad roads, but every year some railways are closing. 
A government railway operator, RZD, closed all owned common 750 mm railways, but still have a number of children's railways with standard rolling stock.

The most well-known narrow-gauge railways are Alapayevsk narrow-gauge railway (municipal passenger), Apsheronsk narrow-gauge railway (mountain industrial railway with passenger service), and Karinskaya narrow-gauge railway (suburban passenger private railway). Also children's railways are located in many big cities.

Overview

1067mm
 Sakhalin Railway. This railway was built by Japan who occupied southern Sakhalin after the Russo-Japanese War. The network was extended to the northern part of the island in the Soviet era.
 Kulebaki Factory Railway is located in Kulebaki.

750mm
 Alapayevsk narrow-gauge railway is located in the Sverdlovsk Oblast, Alapayevsk.
 Altsevo peat railway is located in Nizhny Novgorod Oblast, closed in 2015.
 Apsheronsk narrow-gauge railway the largest mountain railway in Russia.
 Belorucheiskaya narrow-gauge railway is located in Vologda Oblast.
 Dymnoye peat railway is located in Kirov Oblast.
 Gladkoye narrow-gauge railway is located in Leningrad Oblast.
 Gorokhovskoye peat railway is located in Kirov Oblast.
 Gusevskoye peat railway is located in Vladimir Oblast.
 Kerzhenets peat railway is located in Nizhny Novgorod Oblast, closed in 2014.
 Kobrinskaya narrow-gauge railway is located in Kirov Oblast.
 Konetsgorskaya narrow-gauge railway is located in Arkhangelsk Oblast, closed in 2018.
 Kudemskaya narrow-gauge railway has appeared in Forbes.ru ranking one of the 10 most beautiful railway lines of the world in the year 2010.
 Kushaverskoye peat railway is located in Novgorod Oblast.
 Laryan narrow-gauge railway is located in Leningrad Oblast.
 Loyginskaya narrow-gauge railway is located in Arkhangelsk Oblast.
 Lundanskaya narrow gauge railway is located in Kirov Oblast.
 Mesherskoye peat railway is located in Ryazan Oblast.
 Mokeiha-Zybinskoe peat railway is located in Yaroslavl Oblast, closed in 2016.
 Narrow-gauge railway of Decor-1 factory, is located in the Nizhny Novgorod Oblast.
 Narrow-gauge railway of Caprolactam factory, is located in the Dzerzhinsk, closed in 2013.
 Narrow-gauge railway of KSM-2 factory, is located in the Tver, closed in 2020.
 Nyubskaya narrow-gauge railway is located in Arkhangelsk Oblast.
 Pereslavl Railway Museum is located in Yaroslavl Oblast.
 Pelgorskoye peat railway is located in Leningrad Oblast.
 Pishchalskoye peat railway is located in Kirov Oblast.
 Pizhemskaya narrow gauge railway, is located in the Nizhny Novgorod Oblast.
 Ronga narrow gauge railway, is located in the Mari El, closed in 2020.
 Oparinskaya narrow-gauge railway is located in Kirov Oblast, closed in 2020.
 Otvorskoye peat railway is located in Kirov Oblast, closed in 2020.
 Sharya Forest Museum Railway is located in Kostroma Oblast.
 Solotchinskoye peat railway is located in Ryazan Oblast.
 Tumskaja–Golowanowa Datscha railway line, closed in 2008, part of the Gorky Railway
 Tyosovo peat railway is located in Novgorod Oblast.
 Udimskaya narrow-gauge railway is located in Arkhangelsk Oblast.
 Zelennikovskaya narrow-gauge railway is located in Arkhangelsk Oblast, closed in 2018.

See also
Kambarka Engineering Works
List of Russian narrow gauge railways rolling stock

Resource

 This site contains material of Russian narrow-gauge railways. uzd.spb 
 A complete list of Russian and other ex-Soviet. narrow.parovoz.com 
 «The site of the railroad» S. Bolashenko. infojd.ru 
 Pereslavl Railway Museum. www.kukushka.ru

References

Narrow gauge railways in Russia
Railway lines in Russia